Takashi Yanase (February 6, 1919 – October 13, 2013) was a Japanese writer, poet, illustrator and lyricist. He was best known as the creator of the picture book and animated series Anpanman. Yanase was chairman of the Japan Cartoonists Association from May 2000 to 2012.

Religion

The day after his death, an obituary in the October 16, 2013 edition of the Tokyo Shimbun reported that he was "a dandy Christian with a strong faith." However, a correction was later published in the November 20, 2013 edition of the Tokyo Shimbun: "It was an error to refer to Takashi Yanase as a Christian.” Yanase himself wrote in "Gekkan Omoshihan No. 57, Special Feature: No Need for Religion!” in the March 1976 issue of Gekkan Omoshiban No. 57, "I don't have any religious beliefs at all. I’ll probably never turn to religion.” and “I’m not religious at all, even though I respect religion and worship God in my own way. I’m not religious at all.” 

Photos of his gravesite also show no evidence of him being a Christian. His gravesite lacks crosses and references to Jesus Christ. He was cremated and buried at his father’s former home, where he spent his early childhood. On his gravestone is this poem translated from Japanese,
“I want to be a magnolia tree. In the season, bashful and shy, white flowers will bloom. I want to sway with the breeze.”

Works

Poetry

Prose nonfiction
 
 
 
 
 
 
 
  — written in response to the 2011 Tōhoku earthquake and tsunami

Picture books

Standalone works

Mighty Cat Masked Niyandar series
 This series was created as a revision to the premise of his newspaper comic , which ran in the Asahi Shimbun from 1996 to 2000 and had a rabbit protagonist. Three books were published concurrently with the anime of the same name, which was developed in tandem.

Anpanman series
 The first four books
 The original books in the Anpanman series, published during the 1970s. All except Go! Anpanman were run in the   monthly anthology series before being subsequently republished for the mass market under the  imprint; however, the first book was not republished until 1976, making the second book technically the first canonical Anpanman story to be released. Of these, Anpanman and Gorillaman is currently out of print.
 
  (Published under "Froebel-kan no Ehon" imprint)
 
 

 
 Several books originally serialized in the monthly  anthology series in the early 1980s. While they were also released to the mass market, they are now out of print.
 
 
 
 

 
 A series of 25 storybooks published from 1983 to 1984 after the end of the monthly comic. These books were out of print for over a decade until 2010, when they were republished.
 
 
 
 
 
 
 
 
 
 
 
 
 
 
 
 
 
 
 
 
 
 
 
 
 

 
 A 15-book series published between 1987 and 1989, which ended just prior to the start of the weekly newspaper comic strip. Some (but not all) of the series were published in picture-book anthologies prior to mass-market publication. The Soreike! Anpanman anime began during the release of this series, and the character Dokinchan (introduced in book six, Anpanman and Dokin) featured heavily there from the start, influencing Yanase's later Anpanman works.
 
 
 
 
 
 
 
 
 
 
 
 
 
 
 

 Omusubiman series
 A spinoff of the main Anpanman series, featuring the character Omusubiman and his younger companion Komusubiman. Published in the 1980s and early 1990s, all books in the series are now out of print.

 
 A 12-book series begun immediately after the end of the newspaper comic.
 
 
 
 
 
 
 
 
 
 
 
 

  series
 A collection of bedtime stories for children.
 
 
 
 

  series
 Another 12-book collection of original Anpanman stories following up the "Ohanashi Detekoi" series.
 
 
 
 
 
 
 
 
 
 
 
 

  
 A series of small-format storybooks, published in 2003.
 
 
 
 

 
 The latest, still-ongoing Anpanman picture-book series, with six books to date.
 
 
 
 
 
 
 

 Anpanman Christmas books
 Christmas-themed Anpanman books, published irregularly (roughly once a decade).
 
 
 
 

Soreike! Anpanman theatrical movie series
 Official adaptations of the latest films in the Soreike! Anpanman anime series, published concurrently with the film release. In contrast to the official movie titles, the book titles are written without any kanji.

Comics
 
 The heroic adventures of a small person wearing a hat that comes down over his eyes, run in Takashimaya department store's mail-order catalog.　A prototype for the Anpanman character Butterko appears here with the same name, though the name pun is different (from dotabata, running around noisily).

 
This manga was a series of illustrated stories aimed at adults, and included the supporting characters "Nakasu Yaruse" (a cartoonist) and "Miruka Mite" (a female reporter). Never reprinted.

 
The series consisted of 71 two-page chapters of six or eight panels each. Though never republished in collected form, it included several important elaborations of the Anpanman mythos, detailing the character's origin story and introducing the characters Butterko, Cheese, Shokupanman, Currypanman, and Baikinman.

 
 A newspaper comic that ran in the Sunday issue of the Yomiuri Shimbun from 1 January 1990 to 29 May 1994, with a total of 227 strips. The series is partially reprinted in a three-volume collection that covers the first year and a half, with English translation　(by Yuriko Tamaki) in the margins. Apart from its bilingual printing, it is also known for having Baikinman as its focus character, with a number strips in which Anpanman does not appear at all.
 (March 1991)
 (November 1991)
 (December 1991)

Animation

Creator

Vocal performance
 Metropolis (2001): Minor role as a tribute to his former colleague, Osamu Tezuka
 Soreike! Anpanman Christmas Special — "Dance! Sing! Christmas for Everyone" (2006): Special cameo as "Yanase Bunny"

Lyrics
 Norakuro (1970) - Opening theme who was sung by Norakuro's voice actor, Nobuyo Oyama, who was known for dubbing Doraemon in Doraemon's 1979 series and being the first voice actor of Katsuo Isono from Sazae-san.
 Mighty Cat Masked Niyander (2000)
 Tenohira wo Taiyou ni(Japanese wiki page) (1961)

References

External links

Takashi Yanase in Animemorial
Message from the chairman-JCA

1919 births
2013 deaths
Japanese lyricists
Manga artists
People from Kōchi Prefecture
Japanese children's writers
20th-century Japanese musicians
Chiba University alumni
Military personnel of the Second Sino-Japanese War
Japanese military personnel of World War II